Lintneria separatus, the separated sphinx, is a moth of the family Sphingidae. The species was first described by Berthold Neumoegen in 1885. It is found from Colorado south through New Mexico and Arizona to Veracruz and Hidalgo in Mexico.

The wingspan is 110–125 mm. The forewing is dark gray with black and light gray wavy lines. Hindwing is black with a brownish gray border and two white bands. It probably has one brood from late June to early August.

The larvae have been recorded feeding on Salvia greggii.

References

External links
Separated Sphinx Moths of America

Lintneria
Moths described in 1885